Rajkumar Dorendra Singh, also known as R. K. Dorendra Singh (30 September 1934 – 30 March 2018) was a senior Indian politician and a former Chief Minister of Northeast Indian state of Manipur. In the past, he represented a number of political parties; most recently he was with Manipur People's Party. He was a member of the Indian National Congress (INC), Bharatiya Janata Party (BJP), and a few other parties earlier. He was the Chief Minister of Manipur from  6 December 1974 to 16 May 1977, again from 14 January 1980 to 27 November 1980, and from 8 April 1992 to 11 April 1993.

He was elected to the Upper House of the Indian Parliament - the Rajya Sabha from Manipur and served from 20 September 1988 till 12 March 1990 from Indian National Congress party.

See also
List of Rajya Sabha members from Manipur

References

Chief Ministers of Manipur
1934 births
2018 deaths
Rajya Sabha members from Manipur
Chief ministers from Indian National Congress
Bharatiya Janata Party politicians from Manipur